Jannis Turtschan (born 21 October 2001) is a German professional footballer who plays as a midfielder for FC St. Pauli II.

Career statistics

Notes

References

2001 births
Living people
German footballers
Association football midfielders
3. Liga players
Regionalliga players
FC Red Bull Salzburg players
SpVgg Unterhaching players
FC St. Pauli II players
German expatriate footballers
German expatriate sportspeople in Austria
Expatriate footballers in Austria